"London Bombs" is a song by Australian band Eskimo Joe, released digitally in October 2007 as the fifth and final single from their third studio album, Black Fingernails, Red Wine (2006). The song was awarded first place in the Performance Category at the 2007 International Songwriting Competition.

Track listings

Release history

References

Eskimo Joe songs
2006 songs
2007 singles
Mushroom Records singles
Songs written by Joel Quartermain
Songs written by Kavyen Temperley
Songs written by Stuart MacLeod (musician)
Warner Music Australasia singles